Maria Prokopyevna Fedotova-Nulgynet (born December 31, 1946) is an Evenk poet, children's writer, and storyteller.

Born in the Ust-Yansky District, Fedotova-Nulgynet began writing during her childhood, publishing her poetry in a variety of local and regional newspapers. She studied locally before traveling to the village of Khonuu to further her education. She graduated from high school in 1971, and in 1988 finished her degree in absentia from Yakutsk State University. For many years she worked as a teacher in Momsky District; it was during this time that she conducted a literary circle for students, which led to the publication of her first book in 1994. She writes in Evenk, Yakut, and Russian, and has won a variety of awards for her books. Her work deals with the inner lives of children, and has been translated.

References

1946 births
Living people
Evenks
People from Ust-Yansky District
Russian women poets
Russian children's writers
Russian women children's writers
Russian schoolteachers
20th-century Russian poets
20th-century Russian educators
20th-century Russian women writers
21st-century Russian poets
21st-century Russian educators
21st-century Russian women writers
North-Eastern Federal University alumni
20th-century women educators
21st-century women educators